Álvaro de Bazán, 2nd Marquess of Santa Cruz, a.k.a. Álvaro de Bazán y Benavides, a.k.a. Alvaro  II de Bazán, (12 September 1571 in Naples, Italy – 1646), was the son of Álvaro de Bazán, 1st Marquess of Santa Cruz.

Career 
Not as famous as his father, Alvaro II had nevertheless a distinguished military career, as well as on land as on sea.
He was Governor of the Duchy of Milan (1630–1631), Maestro de Campo General in Flanders under the Governess of the Spanish Netherlands Isabel Clara Eugenia (1631), a Spanish Navy commander and Army land General during the Thirty Years War, Member of the Spanish Councils of War and the State Council, Marquess of El Viso, Lord of Valdepeñas, and a Grandee of Spain.
 
Älvaro II main military actions were:

 1596 Defense of Cádiz against the attack of the English Fleet sent by Queen Elizabeth I of England.
 1602 At Sesimbra Bay commanding three galleys where he was defeated by an English fleet under William Monson and Richard Leveson.
 1603 Captain General of the Galleys of the kingdom of Naples.
 1604 Naval actions in the Mediterranean African Coast, Longo Island.
 1605 Siege and Conquest of Estarcho and the City of Durazzo, on the Albanian Coast (in 1606)
 1612 In May, commanding the Naples kingdom Fleet of Galleys, with Ottavio d'Aragona commanding those of the kingdom of Sicily, sink several galleys from Algiers.
 1614 Take part in the transport to North Africa of morisco´s from Spain not willing to become Roman Catholics while living in mainland Spain.
 1622 Takes part in an African expedition.
 1625 Relieved Genoa under siege from the France and the Duchy of Savoy. His action was immortalized in the painting Relief of Genoa by the Marquess of Santa Cruz (1634) by Antonio de Pereda
 1629 Commander of the Mediterranean Galleys.
 1630–1631 Appointed Governor of the Duchy of Milan on the death of Ambrosio Spinola.
 1631 General Governor of the Army of Flanders.
He was married in 1590, in Almagro, Spain, to Guiomar Manrique de Lara. Their descendants included two sons and five daughters.

The evolution of the title since the middle of the 17th century

 Mauro Alvaro, the eldest male, was 3rd Marques, marrying on 22 October 1627, Genoese noble woman Maria Francesca Doria, a daughter of Carlo I Doria del Carretto, 1st Duke of Tursi, a Grandee of Spain with many other lesser titles, (Genoa, Italy, 15 October 1576 – Genoa, Italy, 19 December 1649) and Placidia Spinola, (1584–1660), 2nd Marchioness of Calice and Veppo, between other titles. No surviving adult issue.
 The 4th Marchioness, was the eldest sister of the 2nd Marquess Alvaro II, named Maria Eugenia de Bazán y Benavides. She was married in 1620 to Jerónimo Pimentel, Marquis of Bayona, Viceroy of Sardinia, 1626–1631, deceased 15 April 1631, with issue. He was the 8th son of Juan Alonso Pimentel de Herrera, 5th Duke of Benavente, deceased 7 November 1621, Viceroy of Valencia, 1598–1602, Viceroy of Naples, 1603–1610. The other male of the family, Fernando, became Chancellor, Rector, of the University of Salamanca, and later, after ecclesiastical jobs at Seville and Cordoba, Archbishop of Palermo, Sicily, Italy .
 Thus, the title of Marquess of Santa Cruz became attached to a branch of the Pimentel family, a female called Mencia Pimentel y Bazan. When she married a "Benavides" male, it was agreed by the couple that if they had a male, the male child would be named Francisco Diego de Bazan y Benavides to honor her ancestors and "recuperate" her ancestors name, something not uncommon between the High Spanish Nobility.
 In fact, a son was born and named Francisco de Bazan y Benavides (died in 1680). He was Captain General of the Spanish galleys and Viceroy of Sicily, (1674 Interim), using always his mother's ancestors' family name, "Bazán", as a token of respect, and possibly, duty.

References

External links
 http://www.grandesp.org.uk/historia/gzas/stacruz.htm

1571 births
1646 deaths
Marquesses of Santa Cruz
Nobility from Naples
Governors of the Duchy of Milan
Grandees of Spain
Military personnel from Naples